Liliom is a 1930 American pre-Code drama film directed by Frank Borzage and written by S. N. Behrman and Sonya Levien. The film stars Charles Farrell, Rose Hobart, Estelle Taylor, H. B. Warner, Lee Tracy and Walter Abel. It was an adaptation of the 1909 play of the same name, serving as the first sound version of the film and the first of two sound adaptations of the play in the 1930s, with a 1934 adaptation being directed by Fritz Lang. The film was released on October 5, 1930, by Fox Film Corporation, who also handled the 1934 film. Alongside Just Imagine, also released by Fox, this was one of the first films to employ Rear projection, which is done during a train sequence.

Plot
Liliom, a merry-go-round barker at a Budapest amusement park, becomes enamored of Julie, a servant girl, and though under the influence of Madame Muskat, a sideshow entrepreneur, he marries the girl. Three months pass, with Julie living with her aunt Hulda and Liliom, who left the carousel and doesn't have a job. Although he has not been a good provider, Liliom is spurred into action by the discovery that his wife is pregnant and eventually is influenced by his friend Buzzard, to rob a bank cashier so that he can take Julie to America.

He dies when he stabs himself rather than get caught by the police. When on the train of the afterlife, he is sent to Hell for ten years before he can get a second chance. He comes back for a day, sees his child, then gets annoyed at not being let in the house before he hits her. However, the hit feels like a kiss to the daughter, which means that the memory of Liliom still lives.

Cast        
Charles Farrell as Liliom
Rose Hobart as Julie
Estelle Taylor as Madame Muscat
H. B. Warner as Chief Magistrate
Lee Tracy as The Buzzard
Walter Abel as Carpenter
Mildred Van Dorn as Marie
Guinn "Big Boy" Williams as Hollinger 
Lillian Elliott as Aunt Hulda
Anne Shirley as Louise 
Bert Roach as Wolf
James A. Marcus as Linzman
Harvey Clark as Angel Gabriel
Oscar Apfel as Stefen Kadar (uncredited)

References

External links
 

1930 films
1930s English-language films
Fox Film films
American drama films
1930 drama films
Films directed by Frank Borzage
Films based on works by Ferenc Molnár
Films set in Hungary
Films about the afterlife
American black-and-white films
1930s American films